The Fletcher House is a historic house at 909 Cumberland Street in Little Rock, Arkansas.  It is a two-story American Foursquare house, with a dormered hip roof, weatherboard siding, and a single-story hip-roofed porch across the front.  Built in 1900, it is a well-kept version of a "budget" Foursquare developed by architect Charles L. Thompson.  It has simple Colonial Revival style features, including the porch columns and balustrade.

The house was listed on the National Register of Historic Places in 1982.

See also
National Register of Historic Places listings in Little Rock, Arkansas

References

Houses on the National Register of Historic Places in Arkansas
Colonial Revival architecture in Arkansas
Houses completed in 1900
Houses in Little Rock, Arkansas
National Register of Historic Places in Little Rock, Arkansas